Sergio Daniel Godoy Centeno (born 7 July 1988 in Mendoza) is an Argentinian road cyclist.

Major results
2010
 1st  Time trial, National Under-23 Road Championships
2011
 2nd Overall Vuelta Ciclista de Chile
 3rd Overall Vuelta a Mendoza
1st Prologue (TTT) & Stage 10
2012
 1st Stage 5a Vuelta Ciclista de Chile
 2nd Overall Vuelta a Mendoza
1st Stage 10
2013
 1st Clásica 1 de Mayo
 2nd Time trial, National Road Championships
2014
 2nd Overall Vuelta a Mendoza
 3rd Overall Tour de San Luis
2016
 2nd Overall Vuelta a Mendoza
 3rd Overall Vuelta a la Independencia Nacional

References

Living people
1988 births
Argentine male cyclists
Sportspeople from Mendoza, Argentina
21st-century Argentine people